Desires of the Heart is a 2008 Chinese romantic comedy film directed and written by Ma Liwen, starring Vivian Wu, Ge You, Fan Bingbing, and Cong Shan. The film was first released in China on 20 November 2008, and grossed over ￥20 million.

Cast
 Vivian Wu as Ye Shengying.
 Ge You as the swindler who cheats women.
 Fan Bingbing as a woman with a pair of glasses who was cheated by the swindler.
 Cong Shan as a woman who was cheated by the swindler.

Other
Chen Jin as a middle-aged women who was cheated by the swindler.
Guo Tao as Zhang Su.
Yuen Qiu as Gao Yajuan.
Mei Ting as Zhang Ying.
Geng Le as Zhao Da.
Song Jia as Lin Cong.
Li Chen as Guan Xiang.
Li Xiaolu as Xiao Mei.
Duan Yihong as Zong Yang.
Liu Zhenyun as Wei Xiang, Ye Shengying's former husband.
Baty Chen as Wei Xiang's lover.
Li Na as Zhang Ying's girlfriend.
Gao Fei as Zhang Ying's girlfriend.

Box office
It grossed ￥2 million on its first day, and it grossed ￥20 million on its opening weekend.

References

External links
 
 

2000s Mandarin-language films
Chinese romantic comedy films
2008 romantic comedy films
2008 films
Films directed by Ma Liwen